Tata SIA Airlines Limited, operating as Vistara, is an Indian full-service airline, based in Gurugram, with its hub at Indira Gandhi International Airport. The carrier, a joint venture between Tata Sons and Singapore Airlines, commenced operations on 9 January 2015 with its inaugural flight between Delhi and Mumbai. The airline had carried more than two million passengers by June 2016 and as of May 2019, has a 4.7% share of the domestic carrier market, making it the 6th largest domestic airline. The airline serves 34 destinations with a fleet of Airbus A320, Airbus A321neo, Boeing 787-9 and Boeing 737-800NG aircraft.

In February 2023, Air India CEO Campbell Wilson announced that the Vistara Airlines brand would be dropped and merged with Air India in a few months.

History
The airline was founded in 2013 as a joint venture (JV) between India's conglomerate Tata Sons and Singapore Airlines (SIA). The two companies had made a bid in the mid-1990s to launch a full-service carrier in India that was unsuccessful, being denied regulatory approval by the Indian government. With India opening up its airline sector for 49 percent foreign direct investment (FDI) in 2012, Tata and SIA once again decided to float a JV airline company in India. The JV, Tata SIA Airlines Limited (TSAL), was envisaged as a premium full-service carrier to cater to the demands of high-end business travellers in India's civil aviation market dominated by low-cost carriers. India's Foreign Investment Promotion Board approved the JV in October 2013, allowing SIA to take a 49 percent stake in the airline. The two parent companies initially pledged to invest a combined  as start-up capital, with Tata Sons owning 51 percent and Singapore Airlines owning the remaining 49 percent. This was part of Tata's second major foray into the aviation sector along with a minority stake in AirAsia India. The company's first venture, Tata Airlines, was established in the 1930s and later became the flag carrier Air India after nationalization.

The company unveiled its brand identity "Vistara" on 11 August 2014. The name was taken from the Sanskrit word vistāra, meaning "limitless expanse". Vistara received its air operator's certificate from the Directorate General of Civil Aviation on 15 December 2014 and started operations on 9 January 2015. Vistara became the first carrier to operate domestic services out of the new Terminal 2 at Mumbai's Chhatrapati Shivaji Maharaj International Airport. On 24 August 2015, Vistara inaugurated the Aviation Security Training Institute, an in-house institute for training its cockpit and cabin crew, security staff and others related to aviation industry. The institute has secured the necessary approvals from the nodal body Bureau of Civil Aviation Security. From the first month of operation, Vistara consistently achieved very high on-time performance records of over 90 percent, the highest among India's domestic carriers. On 20 August 2015, Vistara declared it had carried half a million passengers in just over seven months of operations. As of February 2016, Vistara has a share of 2% in the domestic carrier market. Vistara recently received the membership of the International Air Transport Association (IATA), joining the association of more than 280 airlines around the world that represents, leads and serves the airline industry. With this, Vistara becomes one of the select few airlines in India to have the IATA membership.

Vistara announced on 11 July 2019 that their first international destination would be Singapore. The airline started its first international service from Delhi to Singapore and Mumbai to Singapore on 6 and 7 August respectively using the Boeing 737-800 NG which was earlier used by Jet Airways.

On 29 February 2020, the airline took the delivery of its first wide-body Boeing 787-9, becoming the first Indian airline to operate this aircraft and yet to receive five more such aircraft. On 28 May 2020, the airline operated its first commercial flight on Boeing 787-9 Dreamliner on Delhi-Kolkata route. On 28 August the same year, the airline started its first intercontinental flight between Delhi and London Heathrow.

After the acquisition of Air India by the Tata group in January 2022, sources reported the chances of a merger between Vistara and Air India. In November 2022, Tata Group and Singapore Airlines confirmed the merger of two airlines into single airline. According to the merger plan, Singapore Airlines will take up to 25.1% of the stake in the airline. The merger is expected to be completed by March 2024.

Corporate affairs
On 15 April 2014, Vistara chose Phee Teik Yeoh as the chief executive officer (CEO) and Giam Ming Toh as the chief commercial officer (CCO), both from Singapore Airlines.

In March 2015, Vistara shifted to its new office at the One Horizon Center tower in Sector 43, Gurgaon, a satellite city of Delhi. Initially it started out with a three-member board comprising Swee Wah Mak (SIA group), Mukund Rajan and Prasad Menon (Tata group), with the latter as chairman. In January 2016, Bhaskar Bhat, present managing director of Titan, joined as the new chairman following Prasad Menon's retirement. In March 2016, Vistara appointed Sanjiv Kapoor as its chief strategy and commercial officer as the successor to Giam Ming Toh who was scheduled to leave in mid-April 2016 following completion of his deputation at Vistara.

On 16 October 2017, it was announced that Leslie Thng would succeed Yeoh Phee Teik as CEO of Vistara. Yeoh returned to Singapore Airlines to take up a senior management role as Acting Senior Vice President of Customer Experience. Thng was serving as Chief Commercial Officer of Budget Aviation Holdings, a Singapore Airlines subsidiary, prior to his appointment in Vistara. Before that, Thng was the chief executive officer of SilkAir, a full-service regional airline under Singapore Airlines. Sanjiv Kapoor resigned from his position as the Chief Commercial Officer of Vistara, on 31 December 2019, with Vinod Kannan, the Chief Strategy Officer, taking up Kapoor's responsibilities.

Destinations

As of November 2021, Vistara serves 43 destinations across 12 countries. Its main hub is at the Indira Gandhi International Airport. Vistara's first flight was on 9 January 2015, from Delhi to Mumbai. On 6 August 2019, the airline launched its first international flight from Delhi to Singapore using a Boeing 737-800NG aircraft which was earlier used by Jet Airways.

Codeshare agreements
Vistara codeshares with the following airlines:
 Air Canada
 British Airways
 Japan Airlines
 Lufthansa
 Singapore Airlines
 Swiss International Air Lines
 United Airlines

Interline agreements
Vistara has interline agreements with the following airlines:

 Aeroflot
 Air France
 Air Mauritius 
 All Nippon Airways
 American Airlines
 Asiana Airlines
 British Airways
 Emirates 
 Ethiopian Airlines
 Finnair
 flydubai
 Gulf Air
 ITA Airways
 Japan Airlines
 Kam Air
 Kenya Airways
 KLM
 Kuwait Airways
 Qatar Airways
 Singapore Airlines
 SriLankan Airlines
 Turkish Airlines
 United Airlines

Fleet

, Vistara operates the following aircraft:

Vistara took delivery of its first aircraft at New Delhi on 25 September 2014. The airline took delivery of the last of its thirteen original Airbus A320 aircraft in October 2016 and plans to receive its seven Airbus A320neo aircraft by mid-2018. In March 2015, Phee Teik Yeoh announced that the airline was planning to procure an unspecified number of both narrow-body and wide-body aircraft to enhance the domestic network and launch international flights within two years. Vistara inducted nine former Jet Airways Boeing 737-800NG to its fleet following its grounding. Vistara returned two of these planes in January 2020 and the remaining seven will exit the fleet between 2022 and 2023 as they are on long-term leases.
Vistara has a standing order of six 787-9 aircraft with Boeing, for delivery between 2020 and 2021. The first of these Dreamliners were delivered in February 2020 and the second one in August 2020. The airline, which currently has 50 planes, aims to have 70 planes by the end of 2023 after taking into account some aircraft that will be returned to lessors.

Services

Cabin

Business class
On the Boeing 787-9 Dreamliner, Vistara offers 30 Stelia seats in a 1-2-1 configuration. Every seat is able to recline into a full flatbed, and is upholstered in leather. The seats have 44 inches seat pitch with 76 inches length when in full flatbed. The seats also come with a personal stowage compartments, AC and USB outlet, 18-inch HD touchscreen monitor, remote handset for navigating the IFE and controlling the ambient lighting.

Vistara has 8 business class seats, two rows in 2-2 configuration, in its 158-seater Airbus A320-200 fleet.

Premium Economy
Vistara is the first airline in India to introduce Premium Economy class in the domestic market.

At present, it offers 24 premium economy seats, four rows in 3-3 configuration, out of total 158 seats in the single aisle Airbus A320-200 aircraft in its fleet.

On the Boeing 787-9 Dreamliner, it has 21 RECARO seats in a 2-3-2 configuration. The seats are upholstered in leather, with 38 inches of seat pitch and 7 inches recline. These seats come with individually adjustable calf rests and extendable footrests, as well as six-way adjustable headrests. The seats also have AC and USB power outlet, and an IFE with a 13 inches HD touchscreen.

Economy

On the Boeing 787-9 Dreamliner, Vistara has 248 seats, manufactured by RECARO. They are in a 3-3-3 configuration, with 31 inches of seat pitch, as well as 5 inches of recline. These seats also have a 12 inches HD personal entertainment screen, six-way adjustable headrest and USB power outlets.

In-flight entertainment
Vistara World is the airline's wireless Wi-Fi inflight entertainment system that travellers can access on their personal handheld devices. Vistara selected a wireless IFE solution from Bluebox Aviation Systems to enable this service. It offers a multimedia library of over 70 hours’ Bollywood and Hollywood content of various genres. It features movies of various categories such as Drama, Romance, Comedy, Thriller, Action, Adventure and Kids, as well as popular Indian and Western TV programs and a selection of music including Indian, Pop, Jazz, Blues, Rock, Electronica and English Retro. Vistara World offers a live moving map display that allows one to track their aircraft as it flies.

Catering
The in-flight food is catered by TajSATS Air Catering, another joint venture between Tata and a Singaporean company, headed by Chef Arun Batra, formerly the executive chef of the Taj Hotels group. Vistara offers four different meals for each cabin for different time of the day – breakfast, refreshment, lunch and dinner with options of one vegetarian and one non-vegetarian dish in economy class; two vegetarian dishes and one non-vegetarian dish in premium economy; and two vegetarian and two non-vegetarian dishes for business-class cabin. The menu is typically changed every seventh day and there are different menus for lunch and dinner. It also provides special meals upon request 24 hours before departure.

Lounge
On 29 March 2016, Vistara inaugurated premium lounge service for its Business-class passengers and Club Vistara Platinum & Gold members at the departure level of Terminal 3 of Indira Gandhi International Airport at Delhi. The lounge is spread across 250 square meters on the air-side and can seat 75 people at a time.

With effect from 1 April 2020, Vistara has discontinued its Flagship Lounge at Terminal 3 of Indira Gandhi International Airport in Delhi. Vistara now provides lounge access to their eligible guests at the Plaza Premium Lounge at the Mezzanine Floor of Delhi Airport Terminal 3.

Frequent-flyer program
Vistara uses Club Vistara as its frequent-flyer program; it operates as a value-based program and awards points on the basis of money spent on tickets rather than miles travelled by passengers. On 29 January 2015, Vistara announced a partnership agreement with Singapore Airlines which would allow Club Vistara members to earn and redeem miles with the KrisFlyer program on Singapore Airlines flights.

See also
 List of airlines of India
 List of airports in India
 Aviation in India

References

External links

 

Airlines established in 2013
Airlines of India
Companies based in Gurgaon
Singapore Airlines
2013 establishments in Haryana
Indian brands
Tata Airlines
Indian companies established in 2013
Announced mergers and acquisitions